Winchmore Hill Cricket Club is a cricket club in London, United Kingdom. The club was formed in 1880, and play their home games at The Paulin Ground in Winchmore Hill. 
The club competes in the Middlesex County Cricket League (MCCL), notably winning the Premier League in 2012.

Club history

The club was founded in the autumn of 1880 as Winchmore Hill Village Cricket Club by John Moore, who was Head Gardener to the Busk family at Ford's Grove. 'Village' was dropped from the name in 1912, when the current club title was adopted. The pavilion dates back to 1922 and is a former Officer's Mess from a wartime army camp in Wimbledon. The cost of the pavilion, £1,750, was borne mostly from donations and loans by the President and members.

In the 1950s, the West Indies batsman, Allan Rae, played for Winchmore Hill CC whilst completing a law degree in England. During this time he also scored centuries for the West Indies at Lord's and The Oval. In July 1949, a tour match organised by Rae between the West Indies and Winchmore Hill was played at The Paulin Ground, featuring players such as Learie Constantine and Everton Weekes.

In 2012, Winchmore Hill CC secured their maiden Premier League title in the penultimate game of the season against Ealing Cricket Club.

In 2013, Winchmore Hill CC became part of Winchmore Hill Sports Club in recognition of the multi sport nature of the club. Other sports played at The Paulin Ground include football, tennis, hockey and table tennis.

Following the club's maiden Middlesex Premier League title, a period of poor performance followed and the 1st XI was relegated in both the 2013 and 2014 seasons to the Middlesex County Cricket League (MCCL) Division 3. In 2017, Winchmore Hill CC were champions of MCCL Division 3 and promoted to MCCL Division 1 where they have played for the last two seasons.

In 2020, Winchmore Hill CC secured the Middlesex County Cricket League cup, beating North London CC in the final.

The club boasts 3 cricket pitches with electronic scoreboards, high quality nets and a multi-use games area (MUGA). The club's first team pitch has consistently been ranked as one of the best pitches in the league.

Winchmore Hill CC has a longstanding link with Kensington Cricket Club in Adelaide, and many of the club's players have played for both clubs.

Honours

 2012 - ECB Middlesex Premier League Champions

 2020 - ECB Middlesex Cup Champions

Teams 
Winchmore Hill CC field six senior men's teams in Saturday cricket, all playing in their respective Middlesex County Cricket League (MCCL) divisions. The club also fields up to four Sunday teams. A Sunday 1st XI compete in the County and National Cup competitions, Winchmore Hill Tigers and Lions play social matches and a Youth Development XI play in the Middlesex Development League.

Winchmore Hill CC also has a thriving colts section ranging from under 9 to under 17 principally run since 2015 by club Child Development Officer, Jim Clarke. A large number of colts have subsequently progressed to play for the 1st XI and professional county cricket clubs. In 2019, both the under 17 and under 15 colts teams were crowned Middlesex champions. In 2020, the under 17s were again crowned Middlesex champions.

First Team League Records 
Winchmore Hill joined the Middlesex County League in 1972 and since then the following records have been set:

Highest Team Score : 336-1 dec v Richmond at The Paulin Ground in 2009 
Highest Individual Score : 167 – Andy Varley (2003)
Most Runs in a Season : 987 – Shaun Levy (2006)
Best Bowling : 9/17 – Jamie Thorpe v Teddington at The Paulin Ground in 2011 
Most Wickets in a Season : 65 – Frank Griffith (2000)

Cricket Week 

Winchmore Hill CC holds an annual cricket week in July with matches being played every day. Regular cricket week fixtures include matches against the MCC and Wanstead Cricket Club and a 6-a-side cricket tournament. Other activities during cricket week include Boat Racing, Stumps and deceiving batsmen by bowling them oranges.

Notable players

 David Alleyne
 Shamarh Brooks
 Darryl Brown
 David Burton
 Josh Davey
 Frank Griffith 
 Johnny Haynes
 Cliff Holton
 Glen Jackson
 Aaron Laraman
 Danny Law
 Colin Metson
 Scott Newman
 Allan Rae
 Graham Rose
 Kevin Sorrell
 Luke Stoughton

References

External links 
 Middlesex County Cricket League
 Winchmore Hill CC official website
 Winchmore Hill CC Twitter

English club cricket teams
Cricket in Middlesex
Cricket clubs established in 1880